Classical Newtonian physics has, formally, been replaced by quantum mechanics on the small scale and relativity on the large scale. Because most humans continue to think in terms of the kind of events we perceive in the human scale of daily life, it became necessary to provide a new philosophical interpretation of classical physics. Classical mechanics worked extremely well within its domain of observation but made inaccurate predictions at very small scale – atomic scale systems – and when objects moved very fast or were very massive. Viewed through the lens of quantum mechanics or relativity, we can now see that classical physics, imported from the world of our everyday experience, includes notions for which there is no actual evidence. For example, one commonly held idea is that there exists one absolute time shared by all observers. Another is the idea that electrons are discrete entities like miniature planets that circle the nucleus in definite orbits.

The correspondence principle says that classical accounts are approximations to quantum mechanics that are for all practical purposes equivalent to quantum mechanics when dealing with macro-scale events.

Various problems occur if classical mechanics is used to describe quantum systems, such as the ultraviolet catastrophe in black-body radiation, the Gibbs paradox, and the lack of a zero point for entropy.

Since classical physics corresponds more closely to ordinary language than modern physics does, this subject is also a part of the philosophical interpretation of ordinary language, which has other aspects, as well.

The measurement process 
In classical mechanics it is assumed that given properties – speed or mass of a particle; temperature of a gas, etc. – can in principle be measured to any degree of accuracy desired.

Study of the problem of measurement in quantum mechanics has shown that measurement of any object involves interactions between the measuring apparatus and that object that inevitably affect it in some way; at the scale of particles this effect is necessarily large. On the everyday macroscopic scale the effect can be made small.

Furthermore, the classical idealization of a property simply being "measured" ignores the fact that measurement of a property – temperature of a gas by thermometer, say – involves a pre-existing account of the behavior of the measuring device. When effort was devoted to working out the operational definitions involved in precisely determining position and momentum of micro-scale entities, physicists were required perforce to provide such an account for measuring devices to be used at that scale. The key thought experiment in this regard is known as Heisenberg's microscope.

The problem for the individual is how to properly characterize a part of reality of which one has no direct sense experience. Our inquiries into the quantum domain find most pertinent whatever it is that happens in between the events by means of which we obtain our only information. Our accounts of the quantum domain are based on interactions of macro domain instruments and sense organs with physical events, and those interactions give us some but not all of the information we seek. We then seek to derive further information from series of those experiments in an indirect way.

One interpretation of this conundrum is given by Werner Heisenberg in his 1958 book, Physics and Philosophy,p. 144f:
We can say that physics is a part of science and as such aims at a description and understanding of nature. Any kind of understanding, scientific or not, depends on our language, on the communication of ideas. Every description of phenomena, of experiments and their results, rests upon language as the only means of communication. The words of this language represent the concepts of daily life, which in the scientific language of physics may be refined to the concepts of classical physics.  These concepts are the only tools for an unambiguous communication about events, about the setting up of experiments, and about their results. If therefore the atomic physicist is asked to give a description of what really happens in his experiments, the words "description" and "really" and "happens" can only refer to the concepts of daily life or of classical physics. As soon as the physicist gave up this basis he would lose the means of unambiguous communication and could not continue in his science. Therefore, any statement about what has "actually happened" is a statement in terms of the classical concepts and -- because of thermodynamics and of the uncertainty relations -- by its very nature incomplete with respect to the details of the atomic events involved. The demand to "describe what happens" in the quantum-theoretical process between two successive observations is a contradiction in adjecto, since the word "describe" refers to the use of the classical concepts, while these concepts cannot be applied in the space between the observations; they can only be applied at the points of observation.

Primacy of observation in quantum mechanics and special relativity 
Both quantum mechanics and special relativity begin their divergence from classical mechanics by insisting on the primacy of observations and a refusal to admit unobservable entities. Thus special relativity rejects the absolute simultaneity assumed by classical mechanics; and quantum mechanics  does not permit one to speak of properties of the system (exact position, say) other than those that can be connected to macro scale observations. Position and momentum are not things waiting for us to discover; rather, they are the results that are obtained by performing certain procedures.

Notes 
Messiah, Albert, Quantum Mechanics, volume I, pp. 45–50.

See also 

 Heisenberg's microscope
 Philosophy of physics

References 
 Albert Messiah, Quantum Mechanics, English translation by G. M. Temmer of Mécanique Quantique, 1966, John Wiley and Sons
 A lecture to his statistical mechanics class at the University of California at Santa Barbara by Dr. Herbert P. Broida  (1920–1978)
 "Physics and the Real World" by George F. R. Ellis, Physics Today, July, 2005

External links 
 Bohmian Mechanics website

Determinism
Experimental physics
Quantum measurement
Randomness
Philosophy of physics
Philosophy of language
Interpretation (philosophy)